Nguyễn Thành Ngưng (born 8 April 1992) is a Vietnamese race walker. He competed in the men's 20 kilometres walk at the 2016 Summer Olympics.

References

External links
 

1992 births
Living people
Vietnamese male athletes
Vietnamese racewalkers
Olympic athletes of Vietnam
Athletes (track and field) at the 2016 Summer Olympics
Southeast Asian Games medalists in athletics
Place of birth missing (living people)
Southeast Asian Games bronze medalists for Vietnam
Competitors at the 2011 Southeast Asian Games
People from Da Nang